Forcett is a village in the Richmondshire district of North Yorkshire, England. It lies near the border with County Durham, on the B6274 road about 8 miles south of Staindrop. Nearby villages include Eppleby, Caldwell and Aldbrough.

History 
The origin of the place-name is from the Old English words ford and set meaning fold by a ford and appears as Forset in the Domesday Book of 1086.

In 1367, the manor was granted to Sir Walter Urswyk by John of Gaunt, Duke of Lancaster, Earl of Richmond, for Urswyk's valour at the Battle of Navarretta during the Hundred Years' War.  Urswyk was later High Constable of Richmond Castle and Master Forester of the Forest of Bowland.

Buildings 
St Cuthbert's Church is located in the centre of the village.

On the edge of the village is Forcett Park in which stands Forcett Hall, a Palladian country house rebuilt in 1740.

References

External links

Villages in North Yorkshire